Poseci Waqalevu Bune is a former Fijian politician, who has served as Deputy Leader of the Fiji Labour Party (FLP).  From June to December 2006, he served as Minister for the Environment, one of nine FLP ministers, in the multiparty Cabinet of Prime Minister Laisenia Qarase.  His ministerial career was terminated by the coup d'état that deposed the government on 5 December 2006, but on January 8, 2007, he was appointed as Minister for Public Service and Public Service Reform in the interim Cabinet of Commodore Frank Bainimarama.

Prior to entering politics, Bune was career civil servant who held various senior civil positions including Permanent Secretary to the Public Service Commission before his appointment as Fiji's ambassador to the United Nations.

Political career 
Bune began his political career with the now-defunct Christian Democratic Alliance (VLV), which he helped to found in 1998.  He was elected to represent the Macuata Fijian Communal constituency in the House of Representatives on the VLV ticket in 1999, defeating Cabinet Minister Ratu Josefa Dimuri, and was subsequently appointed to the People's Coalition Cabinet by Prime Minister Mahendra Chaudhry.

In the wake of the civilian coup d'état which deposed the Chaudhry government in 2000, however, the VLV splintered in the realignment that followed, with various members teaming up with the Soqosoqo ni Vakavulewa ni Taukei (SVT) or the newly formed Soqosoqo Duavata ni Lewenivanua  (SDL). Bune himself joined the FLP, and in the election held to restore democracy in 2001, he was elected to represent the Labasa Open Constituency on the FLP ticket.  In 2004, he was elected Deputy Leader of the FLP, and on 29 July 2005, he was elected a Vice-President of the party, in addition to his position as Deputy Leader.

Policies 
Bune was known for his outspokenness.  In June 2005, he called on indigenous Fijians to prepare themselves to accept a non-indigenous Prime Minister, saying that the country was ready for it.  On the other hand, he also said that it might be better to go back to being led by chiefs than continuing with leadership by commoners, whom he accused of retarding the country's progress.  "I believe we should go back to having chiefs leading the country because two commoners have led the country and they have taken us backward," Bune said - a reference to Sitiveni Rabuka (Prime Minister 1992-1999 and Laisenia Qarase (Prime Minister since 2000).

Bune strongly opposed the government's plans to establish a Commission with the power to compensate victims and pardon perpetrators of the 2000 coup.  He disputed government claims that most indigenous Fijians supported the legislation, claiming that most had never been told any version other than the government's propaganda.

Bune had strong reservations about the government's promotion of economic growth on the basis of tourism, investment, and construction.  The shift from an agricultural economy would only increase the country's import bills, he claims, as it will cause Fijian landowners to lose interest in farming their land.  There were already signs of this happening, he said on 10 August 2005.  The fact that milk was being imported was reflective of agricultural land lying dormant.  Speaking in Parliament, he said that the government's appeal to potential investors, based on Fiji's high educational standards, widespread fluency in English, a ready labour force, and population of law-abiding systems, did not square with the truth.  Muggings, rapes, and robberies, not to mention coups, were prevalent in Fiji, he said.  Tourism had had a negative effect on indigenous Fijians, he said, with an increase in sexually related diseases and a breakdown of the traditional family unit.  There was too much emphasis on money nowadays, he said, and not enough emphasis on life itself.

Controversies 
On 28 June 2005, Bune joined his party's eight representatives in the Senate in angrily denying rumours published in a newspaper that a Labour Senator had visited imprisoned Senator Ratu Inoke Takiveikata and promised that a future Labour government would free him if he resigned from the SDL Party.  Bune called the report "gutter-level journalism", pointing out that the article provided no names and quoted anonymous sources.  "It is an obvious artifice," Bune said.  Takiveikata was serving (and is still serving) a life sentence for his role in assisting an army mutiny at Suva's Queen Elizabeth Barracks on 2 November 2000, an attempt by hardline Fijian nationalists to seize control of the army, then the country.  Four loyal soldiers were killed in the mutiny, and after their capture, four of the rebels were beaten to death by loyalists.

Labelled "power-hungry" 
Prime Minister Laisenia Qarase branded Bune a "power-hungry" Member of Parliament on 10 August 2005.  Qarase's attack came after Bune delivered a 52-minute speech in parliament, 32 minutes longer than parliamentary rules normally permitted.  Works Minister Savenaca Draunidalo concurred, accusing Bune of having "bullied" fellow-FLP parliamentarian Surendra Lal into giving him his time allocation.  Qarase announced his intention to lay a complaint about Bune's behaviour with Parliament's business committee.

Bune reacted the next day by accusing of the Prime Minister of "exposing his ignorance of the parliamentary process."  The Labour Party had decided, he said, that he should speak on matters sensitive to indigenous Fijians, as he was one of only two ethnic Fijians in the party caucus, and that Lal had agreed to give him 15 minutes of his time allotment.  Parliamentary Speaker Ratu Epeli Nailatikau ruled that Bune's speech was in order, and parliamentary Secretary Mary Chapman confirmed that time-sharing within a party was compatible with parliament's rules.

Clash with Tui Cakau 
In late November 2005, Bune clashed in Parliament with Ratu Naiqama Lalabalavu, a Cabinet Minister and Tui Cakau (Paramount Chief of the Tovata Confederacy), accusing Lalabalavu of misleading the House.  Lalabalavu, who had been sentenced to eight months' imprisonment for unlawful assembly in connection with the army mutiny that took place at Sukanaivalu Barracks in Labasa in 2000, claimed in Parliament on 17 November 2005 that he had acted only with a view to preventing bloodshed.  Responding in the House on 23 November, Bune rejected his defence, saying that only a bargain between the mutineers and Labasa businessmen had prevented the looting of the town during the mutiny.  "Is this the kind of positive influence (he) is speaking of?" Bune demanded, and accused Lalabalavu of trying to rewrite history.  He also denied that Lalabalavu had offered a traditional apology, as claimed, to Mahendra Chaudhry.  The apology had been offered, he said, only to President Ratu Josefa Iloilo, with Chaudhry invited as a guest.  This was why Chaudhry had refused the invitation, Bune said.

Bune's attack provoked a sharp reaction from Prime Minister Qarase, who said that his charges against Lalabalavu were false and disrespectful, and showed that he did not think like a Fijian.  Lalabalavu himself responded two days later with a strongly worded statement in Parliament, declaring that if Bune was truly from Macuata Province, he would not speak against the people who had tried to diffuse an incident that threatened the lives of Macuata people.  He also reiterated his earlier claims that he had offered yaqona to Chaudhry in late 2004 in a traditional request for forgiveness, but had been refused.  He clarified that he had done so because he believed that Chaudhry had been the aggrieved party in the 2000 coup.

In response to the Prime Minister's charge that he had treated a Paramount Chief with disrespect, Bune told Parliament on 30 November that he had not intended his clash with Lalabalavu to be disrespectful of chiefly authority.  He clarified that politicians should differentiate between the Vanua (traditional hierarchy), the church, and the political realm, and recalled that Paramount Chiefs in the past, who have held parliamentary seats, have recognized that distinction.  It was the Opposition's role, he said, to scrutinize government members, but that in no way slighted the chiefs.  "When I stand here to talk about issues, events and situations, it does not mean that I do not respect the chiefs and I want to let that be known," Bune said.

Expulsion from FLP and subsequent coup d'état 

Bune was expelled from the FLP on 28 November 2006, the Fiji Times reported.  The expulsion of Bune and four other senior members of the FLP was related to their criticism of the party's failure to nominate Vijay Singh to the Senate, which they claimed was a breach of promise.  Bune's expulsion from the party was finalized on 4 December 2006. Under the Fijian constitution, Bune was set to forfeit his Ministerial role and his Parliamentary seat, subject to an appeal.  The question was made redundant, however, by the coup d'état that deposed the Qarase government on 5 December 2006, one day after his final expulsion from the Labour Party.

Bune called on Qarase and his supporters to accept the regime change and move aside to allow the country to "move forward."  The lesson learned from history, he said, was that deposed leaders never return to power.

Year of birth missing (living people)
Living people
I-Taukei Fijian members of the House of Representatives (Fiji)
Fiji Labour Party politicians
Permanent Representatives of Fiji to the United Nations
Christian Democratic Alliance (Fiji) politicians
Government ministers of Fiji
I-Taukei Fijian people
Politicians from Macuata Province